Steve Faber is an American screenwriter best known for his work on the movie Wedding Crashers.

Career 
In August 2013, New Line released the Faber-scripted film We're the Millers, with Jennifer Aniston and Jason Sudeikis. Faber also writes poetry and illustrates said poems. Faber has a satiric column on The Huffington Post called "Washingwood." Faber also served as Editor: Politics & Culture, Penthouse Magazine. Faber moved into a different genre after writing NOVEL FIFTEEN for The Blumhouse Book of Nightmares: The Haunted City (Blumhouse Books/Random House).  He was awarded by the WGA for writing Wedding Crashers, named among the 100 best comedic screenplays in cinematic history.

References

External links

American male screenwriters
Living people
Year of birth missing (living people)